Michael Horgan (born 12 July 1934) is a former Irish cyclist. He competed in the 1000m time trial and sprint events at the 1960 Summer Olympics.

References

External links
 

1934 births
Living people
Irish male cyclists
Olympic cyclists of Ireland
Cyclists at the 1960 Summer Olympics
Sportspeople from Plymouth, Devon